Southern Vales is a part of southern Adelaide in the Australian state of South Australia that may refer to:
Hurtle Vale
Morphett Vale
McLaren Vale